Blair Richard Williams (born 10 January 1992) is an Australian who lives and performs in South Korea as a television personality and digital marketer for Doosan Bears baseball team. He was a cast member in the television show Where Is My Friend's Home.

Filmography

Television series

References

External links

1992 births
Living people
Australian television personalities
Australian expatriates in South Korea
People from Brisbane
University of Queensland alumni